Hoseynabad-e Sar Tavileh (also Romanized as Ḩoseynābād-e Sar Ţavīleh and Ḩoseynābād Sar Ţavīleh ; also known as Ḩoseynābād) is a village in Rudbal Rural District, in the Central District of Marvdasht County, Fars Province, Iran. At the 2006 census, its population was 208, in 55 families.

References 

Populated places in Marvdasht County